"Hair" is the title song to the 1967 musical Hair and the 1979 film adaptation of the musical.

Context in the musical

The musical’s title song begins as character Claude slowly croons his reason for his long hair, as tribe-mate Berger joins in singing they "don't know." They lead the tribe, singing "Give me a head with hair,"  "as long as God can grow it," listing what they want in a head of hair and their uses for it. Later the song takes the tune of "The Star-Spangled Banner" with the tribe punning "Oh say can you see/ My eyes if you can/Then my hair’s too short!" Claude and Berger’s religious references continue with many a "Hallelujah" as they consciously compare their hair to Jesus’s, and if Mary loved her son, "why don’t my mother love me?"
The song shows the Tribe's enthusiasm and pride for their hair as well as comparing Claude to a Jesus figure.

The Cowsills version

The song was a major hit for the Cowsills in 1969 and their most successful single. The Cowsills version cuts out most of the religion-themed lyrics, changing "long as God can grow it" to "long as I can grow it" and removing some verses. Their version spent two weeks at number one on the Cash Box Top 100 and reached number two on the Billboard Hot 100. "Hair" was kept out of the number-one spot by another song from the Hair cast album: "Aquarius/Let the Sunshine In" by The 5th Dimension. It also reached number one on the RPM Canadian Singles Chart.

Chart performance

Weekly charts

Year-end charts

Other versions

"Hair" was also covered in Australia in 1969 and released as a single by Doug Parkinson in Focus (B-side with "Without You") and was a top ten hit for him there that year.

A version by Dutch rock band Zen reached the top of the Dutch Top 40 in January 1969. A cover was released as a B-side by girl group Gilded Cage in 1969.

Appearances in media

 The title song as well as another song from the musical, "Good Morning Starshine," were featured in Mystery Science Theater 3000 in the Season 5, 8th episode "Hercules Unchained".
 On The Simpsons episode, "Simpsoncalifragilisticexpiala(Annoyed Grunt)cious", the song is played in the background as Marge's hair starts to fall out from stress.
 On The Simpsons episode, "D'oh-in' in the Wind", the song is played in the hippies' car as Homer wears a jester hat.
 In My Wife and Kids episode, "The Sweet Hairafter", Michael Kyle (Damon Wayans), sings the song playing his keyboard, while his hair supplement grows in.
 In 2009, the song was used in a mash-up with Beyoncé's "Crazy in Love" in the Glee episode 11, "Hairography".
 In the 2015 animated film Minions, Stuart used a "hypno hat" to hypnotize three of the palace guards while breaking into the Tower of London, and made them sing the song (in the Minion Language), dance, strip to their underwear and let their hair down.

References
Citations

Sources
Joel Whitburn,  The  Billboard Book of Top 40 Hits  (6th ed. 1996), p. 148.

External links
 

1967 songs
1969 singles
Cowsills songs
Songs written for films
Songs from Hair (musical)
Song recordings produced by Norrie Paramor
Cashbox number-one singles
Number-one singles in Australia
RPM Top Singles number-one singles
Number-one singles in New Zealand
Number-one singles in South Africa
MGM Records singles